The Montgomery Women's Facility is a prison for women run by the Alabama Department of Corrections (ADOC). It is located behind Kilby Correctional Facility in Mt. Meigs, an unincorporated area in Montgomery County, Alabama. Opened in 1976, it has a capacity of 300 inmates; its warden is Adrienne Givens.

See also

List of Alabama state prisons

References

External links
 Kilby Correctional Facility - Alabama Department of Corrections

Prisons in Alabama
Buildings and structures in Montgomery County, Alabama
State government buildings in Alabama
1976 establishments in Alabama
Women's prisons in the United States
Women in Alabama